Morgan – A Suitable Case for Treatment (also called Morgan!) is a 1966 comedy film made by British Lion. It was directed by Karel Reisz and produced by Leon Clore from a screenplay by David Mercer, based on his BBC television play A Suitable Case for Treatment (1962), the leading role at that time being played by Ian Hendry.

The film stars David Warner, Vanessa Redgrave, and Robert Stephens, with Irene Handl and Bernard Bresslaw.

Plot
Morgan Delt (David Warner) is a failed working-class London artist, who was raised as a communist by his parents. His upper-class wife, Leonie (Vanessa Redgrave), has given up on him and is in the process of getting a divorce in order to marry Charles Napier (Robert Stephens), an art gallery owner of her own social standing. Locked into a personal world of fantasy, Morgan performs a series of bizarre stunts in a campaign to win back Leonie, including putting a skeleton in her bed and blowing up the bed as her mother sits on it. When these stunts fail, Morgan secures the help of Wally "The Gorilla" (Arthur Mullard), a pro wrestler friend of his mother (Irene Handl), to kidnap Leonie, who still nurtures residual feelings of love tinged with pity for Morgan. Leonie is left with Morgan and Wally in the British countryside (with ironically intercut clips from Tarzan). Leonie soon gets rescued, and Morgan is arrested and imprisoned.

After escaping, he crashes the wedding reception of Leonie and Charles dressed as a gorilla (with clips from King Kong used to illustrate Morgan's fantasy world). Morgan flees the wedding on a motorcycle with his gorilla suit on fire, and subsequently is committed to an insane asylum, where Leonie visits him looking visibly pregnant. With a wink, Leonie tells him he is the child's father. Morgan returns to tending a flowerbed, as the camera pulls out to a longshot of the entire circular flowerbed with the enclosed flowers arranged into a hammer and sickle.

Cast
 David Warner as Morgan Delt
 Vanessa Redgrave as Leonie Delt
 Robert Stephens as Charles Napier
 Irene Handl as Mrs. Delt
 Bernard Bresslaw as Policeman
 Arthur Mullard as Wally
 Newton Blick as Mr. Henderson
 Nan Munro as Mrs. Henderson
 Peter Collingwood as Geoffrey
 Graham Crowden as Counsel
 John Garrie as Tipstaff
 John Rae as Judge
 Peter Cellier as Second Counsel

Reception
The film was nominated for Academy Awards for Best Actress in a Leading Role (Vanessa Redgrave) and Best Costume Design, Black-and-White (Jocelyn Rickards).

The film was also nominated for the Palme d'Or (Golden Palm) at the 1966 Cannes Film Festival and Redgrave was awarded Best Actress.

A film poster for Morgan is prominently shown in the 2016 film High-Rise (adapted from the novel of the same name by J. G. Ballard).

References

External links 
 
 
 
 

1966 films
1966 comedy-drama films
British comedy-drama films
British independent films
British black-and-white films
Films directed by Karel Reisz
Films set in London
1966 independent films
Films scored by John Dankworth
1960s English-language films
1960s British films